Đình (Chữ Hán: 亭) or Vietnamese communal houses are typical of buildings found in Vietnam villages, dedicated to worship the village God Thành hoàng, the village founder or a local hero. They also play the role as a meeting place of the people in the community, akin to modern civic centers.

Gallery

See also 
 
 

Religious buildings and structures in Vietnam
Architecture in Vietnam